Roger Depue is a 21-year veteran of the Federal Bureau of Investigation (FBI), where he served as Unit Chief for the Behavioral Science Unit at the FBI Academy at Quantico, Virginia.  Following retirement Depue founded The Academy Group, Inc (AGI). He served on the panel investigating the Virginia Tech shooting and its handling by the University. He spoke at length about the report at a press conference on August 30, 2007. Depue is the coauthor of Between Good and Evil: A Master Profiler's Hunt for Society's Most Violent Predators.

History

According to the book "Between Good and Evil" that he co-authored with Susan Schindehette, (Chapter Two, page eleven onwards) Roger Depue was born in Detroit, Michigan, USA, in February 1938. Dr. Depue, is one of the five sons of the late Alvoy Depue, who was a police officer. 

As one of the pioneers of the FBI's Behavior Science Unit, Depue was first assigned there as a Supervisory Special Agent in 1974. He served as an instructor and researcher until his promotion to the position of Chief of Behavioral Sciences in 1980, a post he held until his retirement from the FBI in 1989.

Regarding his work with violent predators, Depue said, 

Understanding the fantasy is very important. Many times in crime scene you can see fantasy. Many times the criminals with intense fantasies will draw victimizations. In prison and criminological research you will find all kinds of drawings where the fantasy is still alive.

This led him to coin the term "leakage", which basically means that one's fantasies consciously or subconsciously tend to leak out. It allows offender profilers to obtain information on a criminal's motivation.

After Depue's wife died of cervical cancer, he joined a Seminary for a while in an attempt to deal with his despair. This eventually led him to transform his work into preventing rather than solving crime.

One of his most important contributions for ensuring justice for the victim was the cold case of Terri Brooks. She was an assistant manager at a Roy Rogers in Bucks County, Pennsylvania. She was found brutally murdered with her head wrapped in a trash bag and a knife stuck in her back. A large amount of money was missing, and as a result, the detectives ruled it a robbery that went bad. Terri's fiancé James Keefe was interviewed once but not interrogated. Depue became involved in this case several years later, and the memory of it haunted him. Through case examination, advanced profiling techniques and an interview of the fiancé, Roger immediately named Keefe as the main suspect. Law enforcement officials at the time were complacent and did not follow up on Depue's finding. This caused him much angst as he was retired from official law enforcement. Years later, Chief Arnold Conoline 
of Falls Township reopened the case. With DNA evidence, Officer Nelson E. Whitney II got a signed confession from the fiancé.

Another case important to Depue was that of James Joseph Richardson. Even though Richardson was viewed as a victim of injustice, Depue disagreed and made a compelling argument why he was guilty of killing his seven children.

Sources and further reading
 
 Chasing the Dragon: A Conversation with the Academy Group. (Interview with Roger Depue), Millennium TV series Fox DVD documentary, 2004.

References

Federal Bureau of Investigation agents
Offender profiling
Living people
Year of birth missing (living people)